is a former professional Japanese baseball infielder and current coach for the Saitama Seibu Lions in Japan's Nippon Professional Baseball.

He was previously married to Chiharu Niiyama, a Japanese actress.

External links

1975 births
Living people
Baseball people from Hyōgo Prefecture
Japanese baseball players
Seibu Lions players
Yomiuri Giants players
Japanese baseball coaches
Nippon Professional Baseball coaches